Waldia may refer to:

 Valjala, Saare County, Estonia
 Weldiya, Semien Wollo Zone, Amhara Region, Ethiopia
 Weldiya (Afder), Somali Region, Ethiopia